Komarane (Serbian Cyrillic: Комаране) is a village in Central Serbia (Šumadija), in the municipality of Rekovac (Region of Levač), lying at , at the elevation of 280 m. According to the 2002 census, the village had 254 citizens.

External links
 Levac Online
 Article about Komarane
 Pictures from Komarane

Populated places in Pomoravlje District
Šumadija